Brianne Natalia Bethel (born 5 July 1998) is a Bahamian sprinter.

A student at the University of Houston, Bethel secured her place at the delayed 2020 Tokyo Olympics when she ran two personal bests, including attaining an Olympic qualifying time, National Collegiate Athletic Association (NCAA) conference championships in May 2021 in Tampa, Florida. She clocked a personal best of 22.54 seconds in the 200m to become the eighth Bahamian to qualify for the Olympic Games and went on to compete in the Women's 4 × 400 metres relay event.

Her twin sister, Brittni, is a teammate of hers on the Houston track team.

References

External links
 Houston Cougars bio

1998 births
Living people
Bahamian female sprinters
Houston Cougars women's track and field athletes
Twin sportspeople
Bahamian twins
People from Freeport, Bahamas
Athletes (track and field) at the 2019 Pan American Games
Pan American Games competitors for the Bahamas
Athletes (track and field) at the 2020 Summer Olympics
Olympic athletes of the Bahamas